Spiegler is a surname. Notable persons with that name include:

 Franz Joseph Spiegler (1691–1757), German painter
 Gerhard Spiegler (1929–2015), American academic
 Marc Spiegler (born 1968), French-American art journalist
 Mark Spiegler, American pornographic talent agent
 Mordechai Spiegler (born 1944), Israeli footballer

See also
 Spiegel (surname)
 Spiegelmann 
 Spiegelman

References

German-language surnames
Jewish surnames
Yiddish-language surnames